Niamh Síle Bhreathnach (1 June 1945 – 6 February 2023) was an Irish Labour Party politician who served as Minister for Education from 1993 to 1994 and 1994 to 1997.

She served as a Teachta Dála (TD) for the Dún Laoghaire constituency from 1992 to 1997. She was a senator from June 1997 to July 1997, after being nominated by the Taoiseach.

Early life and education
Niamh Síle Bhreathnach was born in Loughlinstown, Dublin, on 1 June 1945. She was the daughter of Breandán Breathnach, a civil servant and collector of traditional music. She was educated at Dominican College Sion Hill and Froebel College of Education, Dublin, later qualifying as a remedial teacher.

Career 
Bhreathnach sought election for the first time in 1985, standing in the local electoral area of Blackrock at the 1985 Dublin County Council election. Bhreathnach was chairperson of the Labour Party from 1990 until 1993. She was first elected to Dublin County Council at the 1991 election.

Bhreathnach was elected as a TD for Dún Laoghaire at the 1992 general election, serving until her defeat at the 1997 general election. In January 1993, she was appointed minister for education in the Fianna Fáil–Labour Party coalition government, serving until Labour left government in November 1994. She was appointed to the same post in December 1994 in the Rainbow Coalition, serving until June 1997. 

During her time as minister, the first white paper on Education was published, tuition fees for third-level institutions were abolished, and the Regional Technical Colleges were upgraded to Institutes of Technology. She also brought in the legacy posts, extra teaching positions for disadvantaged schools. She introduced the University Act 1997, which made universities accountable for the public money they receive.

After losing her Dáil seat in 1997, Bhreathnach was nominated by the outgoing Taoiseach, John Bruton, to the last days of the 20th Seanad. She sought a nomination from the Labour Party for the elections to the 21st Seanad, and there was some surprise when she was not one of the five candidates nominated by the party. She did not seek a nomination from the nominating bodies.

Bhreathnach stood again for the Dáil at the 2002 general election, but did not regain her seat, and did not contest the 2007 general election. She was a member of Dún Laoghaire–Rathdown County Council for the Blackrock local electoral area from 2004 to 2014.

Personal life and death 
Bhreanthnacht was married to Tom Ferris, with whom she had two children. Bhreathnach died in Blackrock, Dublin, on 6 February 2023, at age 77.

References

External links
Niamh Bhreathnach's page on the Labour Party website

1945 births
2023 deaths
Labour Party (Ireland) TDs
Members of the 20th Seanad
20th-century women members of Seanad Éireann
Members of the 27th Dáil
20th-century women Teachtaí Dála
Local councillors in Dún Laoghaire–Rathdown
People educated at Dominican College Sion Hill
Ministers for Education (Ireland)
Women government ministers of the Republic of Ireland
Nominated members of Seanad Éireann
Labour Party (Ireland) senators